Unnimaya Prasad is an Indian actress, assistant director and producer who works in Malayalam cinema. She worked as the casting director of Maheshinte Prathikaram (2016), and as assistant director of Thondimuthalum Driksakshiyum (2017). She is associated with the new wave of Malayalam cinema. She is also a practicing architect.

Early life

Born and brought up in Kochi, Unnimaya studied architecture at the College of Engineering, Thiruvananthapuram, and then at Manipal Institute of Technology, Manipal.

Personal life

She is married to screenwriter and producer  Syam Pushkaran.

Career
She debuted as an actress with the character Sethulakshmi in the film 5 Sundarikal. Her portrayal of a class teacher in a minor role in Soubin Shahir's  Parava. She played the central character of Deputy Commissioner of Police Catherine Maria in  Anjaam Pathiraa' (2020). She has acted in minor roles in movies including Maheshinte Prathikaram (2016), Mayanadi(2017), Varathan(2018), Oru Kuprasidha Payyan(2018) and Virus (2019).

She worked as the casting director of Maheshinte Prathikaram and assistant director of Mayanadi (2017),Thondimuthalum Driksakshiyum and Kumbalangi Nights(2019).

Her performance in Joji won her the Best Character Actress award in 52nd Kerala State Film Awards.

Filmography

All films are in Malayalam language unless otherwise noted.

As Actress

As Assistant director

As Executive producer

References

External links
 

Living people
Indian film actresses
Actresses in Malayalam cinema
Actresses in Tamil cinema
20th-century Indian actresses
21st-century Indian actresses
Year of birth missing (living people)